Jean-Paul Petit (born 10 August 1945) is a French field hockey player. He competed in the men's tournament at the 1968 Summer Olympics.

References

External links
 

1945 births
Living people
French male field hockey players
Olympic field hockey players of France
Field hockey players at the 1968 Summer Olympics
Sportspeople from Lyon